The 2016 Eastern Washington Eagles football team represented Eastern Washington University in the 2016 NCAA Division I FCS football season. They were led by head coach Beau Baldwin, who was in his ninth season with Eastern Washington. The Eagles played their home games at Roos Field in Cheney, Washington and were a member of the Big Sky Conference.  They finished the season 12–2, 8–0 in Big Sky play to share the conference championship with North Dakota. They received the automatic bid into the FCS Playoffs where they defeated Central Arkansas and Richmond in the second round and quarterfinals, before losing to Youngstown State in the semifinals.

On January 16, 2017, head coach Beau Baldwin resigned to become the offensive coordinator at California. He finished at Eastern Washington with a nine year record of 85–32.

Schedule

Source: Schedule

Roster

Game summaries

At Washington State

At North Dakota State

Northern Iowa

At Northern Arizona

UC Davis

Northern Colorado

At Montana State

Montana

At Cal Poly

Idaho State

At Portland State

FCS playoffs

Second round – Central Arkansas

Quarterfinals–Richmond

Semifinals–Youngstown State

Ranking movements

References

Eastern Washington
Eastern Washington Eagles football seasons
Big Sky Conference football champion seasons
Eastern Washington
Eastern Washington Eagles football